Al-Arabi Sports Club, also known as Al-Arabi Al-Saudi, is a Saudi Arabian club (First División Saudi Arabia Football)  which contains a number of sports, most notably football, basketball and handball. It based in Unaizah, Al-Qassim in 1958. Its crest has white and red colors. Al-Arabi has a fierce rivalry with local club Al-Najma, which is usually manifested in the Unaizah Derby.

History

Establishment

Al Arabi's name means "The Arabian", Al Arabi Sporting Club was associated in Unaizah 1958, by a group of young people in city . Suleiman Al-Badi was took over the club on an informal basis. The club operated unofficially as an amateur club until 1967 when it was registered officially with the General Presidency of Youth Welfare Abdulrrhman Al-N'aim was officially took over it. The Club gain fourteen presidents from its establish until 2010, Currently Adeeb Al-Kwiter is the president.

Football

Footboll team was qualified for the first time in 1986/ 1985 season To participate in the qualifying tournament which was held in Al-Hasa and got onto the shield, Al-Arabi played for the first time in Saudi First Division in 1986/1987 season However, It played four season until it won Saudi Premier League in 1989/1990 season .
The club played one season in Saudi Premier League then relegated to the Saudi First Division four years . Then in 1994/1995 it also relegated to Saudi Second Division where it played to get a qualifier rise to Saudi First Division season 1995/1996, and failed to rise to the first division in the finals which was held in Al-Hasa.
It played in the second division, which established for the first time season 1996/1997, and still there until it fell in season 1998/1999 to the third division, after playing three seasons there. It continued in the third division until managing to qualify in season 2001/2002 in final qualification which was held in Najran and got the shield. The team came back to Saudi Second Divisionseason 2002/2003. But it relegated to the third division season 2004/2005. after it played three season in second division .It return in season 2008/2009 to Saudi Second Division after getting second place in final qualification which was held in Dammam. Season 2009/2010 played in the second division and now season 2012/2013 it still play in it.

that is currently playing in the Saudi Second Division League. It ascended to the Saudi Premier League 1990–91 season, but it fail to a wali division clubs after one season

1 seasons in Saudi Professional League
8 seasons in Saudi First Division
18 seasons in Saudi Second Division
7 seasons in Saudi Third Division

Current squad 
As of Saudi First Division League:

Out on loan

Club honours (Football)
Saudi First Division :
Runner up (1) : 1989–90
Saudi Second Division :
Champion (2) : 1986–87, 2021–22
Saudi Third Division :
Champion (1) : 2001–02

Current Technical staff

Coaches history
 Akram Ahmad Salman 1989–1992
 Wardi Murad 2010–2011

Basketball

Club honours (Basketball)
Saudi Basketball U-17 tournament: 1
1997

Club honours (Hand Ball)

Saudi Federation Handball Cup: 1
1983
Saudi youth handball tournament: 1
1977
Saudi Handball U-17 Premier League: 1
2009

Stadium

Al-Arabi does not have a football stadium but a playground for training only and does not have strips. A sport compound was built in Unaizah with facilities for wide range of competitive sports, and the General Presidency of Youth Welfare decided to hold a draw between the city's two clubs for right to use it, and Al-Najma club gained the right without a draw.
In February 2007 during an interview on a program called C.V.'', broadcast on the Saudi sports channel, Saleh Al-Wassel, the then president of Al-Najma, admitted that he used his influence to obtain the newly built sports facility in Unaizah.

Al Arabi is currently playing all of its home matches at the Department of Education Stadium.

Indoor facilities
Al-Arabi Pavilion was an Indoor sports arena used particularly for basketball and handball matches of Al-Arabi. located in the Al-Arabi Club, Spain. Its capacity is 7,00 people. which was built in 2007.

Presidents

 Suleiman Al-Badi
 Abdulrahman Al-Naim
 Ahmed Al-Turki
 Mohammed Al-Manea
 Ibrahim Al-Zaki
 Abdulrahman Al-Musaed
 Ahmad Al-Mansur
 Fahad Al-Wahaibi
 Ahmad Al-Subaie
 Ahmed Al-Marzouq
 Adeeb Al-Kwiter
 Mohammed Al-Dukahil
 Abdulaziz Al Dera
 Ameen Al Malah

References

External links
Unaizah
Unofficial 
Al-Arabi page at kooora.com – Arabic
Al-Arabi page at goalzz.com – English

Football clubs in Saudi Arabia
Association football clubs established in 1958
Unaizah
1958 establishments in Saudi Arabia
Football clubs in Unaizah